The 2023 Dalian Professional F.C. season is the 14th season in club history.

Overview

Preseason 
The CFA decided to ban Dalian Pro from registering new players at the beginning of January for previous salary disputes.

The team started winter training on 8 February for one week, then moved to Haian on 15 February. Multiplayers left the team as their contracts were expired.

As reported, Dalian Pro would be probably banned from transfer by FIFA for one or a few windows for violations in the previous season.

Lin Liangming entered national team's training squad on 26 February. Former Dalian Pro player Sun Guowen was also included.

On 13 March, the team moved again to Shanghai for another stage of preason training.

Squad

First team squad

Coaching staff

Transfers

Pre-season

In

Out

Mid-season

In

Out

Friendlies 
Preseason

Chinese Super League

Standings

League table

Results summary

Positions by round

Fixtures and results

Chinese FA Cup

FA Cup fixtures and results

Squad statistics

Appearances and goals

Goalscorers

Disciplinary record

Injuries

Suspensions

References 

Dalian Professional F.C. seasons
Dalian Professional F.C.